The external debt of India is the total debt the country owes to foreign creditors. The debtors can be the Union government, state governments, corporations or citizens of India. The debt includes money owed to private commercial banks, foreign governments, or international financial institutions such as the International Monetary Fund (IMF) and World Bank.

India's external debt data is published quarterly, with a lag of one quarter. Statistics for the first two quarters of the calendar year are compiled and published by the Reserve Bank of India. Data for the last two quarters is compiled and published by the Ministry of Finance. The Government of India also publishes an annual status report on the debt which contains detailed statistical analysis of the country's external debt position.

At end-March 2022, India’s external debt was placed at US$ 620.7 billion, recording an increase of US$ 47.1 billion over its level at end-March 2021
India’s external debt was US$570 billion at the end of March 2021. It recorded an increase of US$11.6 billion over its level at end of March 2020. The external debt to GDP ratio declined to 19.9 per cent at end-March 2022 from 21.2 per cent at end-March 2021..

The foreign currency reserves is at US$ 573 billion as on 05 August 2022. It was US$ 619 billion as on 25th March 2022 compared to US $579 billion at the end of March 2021 & compared to over US $474 billion at the end of March 2020. Hence the foreign currency reserves as a ratio to external debt is at 100.3% at end of Mar2022 when compared to 101.1% at end of March 2021 from 84.9% at end of March 2020.

Long-term debt
The composition pattern of India's external debt is noted below. Long-term borrowings (more than a year to maturity) dominate India's external debt. India classifies its long-term external debt into seven heads. The external debt column notes the value of external debt stock outstanding at the end of March 2021.

Multilateral
Multilateral debt is the money India owes to international financial institutions such as the Asian Development Bank (ADB), the International Development Association (IDA), the International Bank for Reconstruction and Development (IBRD), the International Fund for Agricultural Development (IFAD) and others. Borrowing from the International Monetary Fund (IMF) are not included under multilateral debt, and are instead classified separately under the IMF head. As on 31 March 2021, India had a total multilateral debt of $69.7 billion. The country's major creditors are the IDA, ADB, and IBRD. The IFAD and a few other multilateral creditors hold the remaining portion of the multilateral debt.

Bilateral
Bilateral debt is the money India owes to foreign governments. As on 31 March 2021, India had a total bilateral debt of $31.0 billion.

Currency composition
India's external debt is held in multiple currencies, the largest of which is the United States dollar. As on 31 March 2020, 53.7% of the country's debt was held in U.S. dollars. The rest of the debt is held in Indian rupees (31.9%), Japanese yen (5.6%), special drawing rights (4.5%),  Euros (3.5%) and other currencies (0.8%).

Concerns and issues
Moody’s Investors Service upgraded India's government bond rating from Baa3 to Baa2 on 16 November 2017. In the announcement, Moody’s noted that "greater expectation of a sizeable and sustained reduction in the general government debt burden, through increased government revenues combined with a reduction in expenditures, would put positive pressure on the rating."

References

India
Economy of India